John C. Boyle Reservoir is an artificial impoundment behind John C. Boyle Dam on the Klamath River in the U.S. state of Oregon.

Spencer Bridge carries the highway over the lake at about its midpoint.

Fluctuations of up to  daily in the reservoir level occur as water is added for storage or diverted for power generation.

History
The California–Oregon Power Company (COPCO), which later merged with Pacific Power, a future subsidiary of PacifiCorp, built the dam in the mid-1950s as part of the multi-dam Klamath River Hydroelectric Project. Originally called Big Bend Reservoir, it was renamed in 1962 for John C. Boyle, COPCO's vice president, general manager, and chief engineer.

The Boyle dam is one of four Klamath River dams that may be removed as early as 2020 if the United States Congress eventually agrees. The other three, all owned by PacifiCorp and all in California, are Iron Gate, Copco 2, and Copco 1. A tentative agreement reached in 2009 by major stakeholders, including PacifiCorp, would remove the dams to restore salmon runs blocked below Iron Gate for about a century.As of February 25, 2022, the FERC released their final Environmental Impact Statement (EIS) on the dam's removal. The dam is expected to be removed sometime in 2023 or 2024.

It is named after John C. Boyle (1899-1979), who was vice president, general manager, and long-time chief engineer of the California Oregon Power Company (COPCO), a privately held utility that served southern Oregon and portions of northern California.

Recreation
Other fish found in the lake include black crappie, white crappie, yellow perch, brown bullhead, and pumpkinseed sunfish.

Topsy Recreation Site, maintained by the Bureau of Land Management, has a campground, a boat launch, a dock, and a fishing pier at J. C. Boyle Reservoir. Swimming, picnicking, and bird-watching are among recreational activities in addition to camping and fishing.

See also
 List of lakes in Oregon

References

Lakes of Klamath County, Oregon
Reservoirs in Oregon
1950s establishments in Oregon